Alice de Boer (1872 - 1955) was a medical doctor in Sri Lanka, and one of the first women in the country to qualify as a doctor.

Biography 
De Boer's family was of Dutch Burgher background. After studying medicine in Edinburgh, Scotland, she was an assistant to Mary Nona Fysh, who was the medical officer-in-charge at Lady Havelock Hospital for Women.

References 

1955 deaths
1872 births
Sri Lankan medical doctors
Sri Lankan people of Dutch descent
People from British Ceylon